In mathematics, the image of a function is the set of all output values it may produce.

More generally, evaluating a given function  at each element of a given subset  of its domain produces a set, called the "image of  under (or through) ".

Image and inverse image may also be defined for general binary relations, not just functions.

Definition

The word "image" is used in three related ways. In these definitions,  is a function from the set  to the set

Image of an element

Similarly, given a set   is said to "" if there exists   in the function's domain such that  
However, "" and "" means that  for  point  in 's domain.

Image of a subset

Throughout, let  be a function. 
Using set-builder notation, this definition can be written as

Image of a function

The image of a function is the image of its entire domain, also known as the range of the function. This last usage should be avoided because the word "range" is also commonly used to mean the codomain of

Generalization to binary relations

If  is an arbitrary binary relation on  then the set  is called the image, or the range, of  Dually, the set  is called the domain of

Inverse image

Other notations include  and  

Notation for image and inverse image
The traditional notations used in the previous section do not distinguish the original function  from the image-of-sets function ; likewise they do not distinguish the inverse function (assuming one exists) from the inverse image function (which again relates the powersets).  Given the right context, this keeps the notation light and usually does not cause confusion.  But if needed, an alternative is to give explicit names for the image and preimage as functions between power sets:

Arrow notation

  with 
  with

Star notation

  instead of 
  instead of

Other terminology

 An alternative notation for  used in mathematical logic and set theory is 

Examples

The preimage of  under  is  The preimage of set  under  is the empty set, because the negative numbers do not have square roots in the set of reals.
  defined by  The fibers  are concentric circles about the origin, the origin itself, and the empty set (respectively), depending on whether  (respectively). (If  then the fiber  is the set of all  satisfying the equation  that is, the origin-centered circle with radius )
 A quotient group is a homomorphic image.

Properties

General 

For every function  and all subsets  and  the following properties hold:

Also:

Multiple functions 

Multiple subsets of domain or codomain 

For function  and subsets  and  the following properties hold:

The results relating images and preimages to the (Boolean) algebra of intersection and union work for any collection of subsets, not just for pairs of subsets:

 
 
 
 
(Here,  can be infinite, even uncountably infinite.)

With respect to the algebra of subsets described above, the inverse image function is a lattice homomorphism, while the image function is only a semilattice homomorphism (that is, it does not always preserve intersections).

See also

Notes

References

 
 .
  
 
 
  

Basic concepts in set theory
Isomorphism theorems